Events from the year 2003 in Sweden

Incumbents
 Monarch – Carl XVI Gustaf
 Prime Minister – Göran Persson

Events
 10 September – Foreign Minister Anna Lindh stabbed whilst shopping at a Stockholm department store.
 11 September – Foreign Minister Anna Lindh dies of stab injuries.
 14 September – 2003 Swedish euro referendum

Popular culture

Film
 16 September – Evil, a drama film directed by Mikael Håfström, was released in Sweden. The film had earlier been presented at the Cannes film festival.

Births
 3 January Greta Thunberg, climate activist.

Deaths

 15 January – Arne Palmqvist, bishop (born 1921).
 16 March – Lars Passgård, actor (born 1941).
 25 August – Hjalmar Pettersson, cyclist (born 1906).
 11 September – Anna Lindh, Foreign Minister (born 1957)
 26 September – Olle Anderberg, sport wrestler, Olympic champion in 1952 (born 1919).
 30 October – Börje Leander, footballer (born 1918).

See also
 2003 in Swedish television

References

 
Years of the 21st century in Sweden
Sweden
Sweden
2000s in Sweden